Adelia Marra (born 1 March 1979) is an Italian speed skater. She competed in two events at the 2006 Winter Olympics.

References

1979 births
Living people
Italian female speed skaters
Olympic speed skaters of Italy
Speed skaters at the 2006 Winter Olympics
Sportspeople from Como